Herbert Arlene (September 5, 1914 – November 9, 1989) was an American politician from Pennsylvania who served as a Democratic member of the Pennsylvania State Senate for the 3rd district from 1967 until 1980. He was the first African-American elected to the Pennsylvania Senate.  He also served in the Pennsylvania House of Representatives for the Philadelphia County district from 1959 to 1966.

Early life
Arlene was born in Harrison, Georgia to Elbert and Mattie King Arlene.  He graduated from the Philadelphia public schools, Philadelphia Business College and received an honorary L.L.D. from Miller College.

Career
He was the owner of Arlene's Tailor Shop and a member of the board of trustees of Lincoln University, the board of directors of the Greater Philadelphia Development Corporation, the Bearean Institute, Hospital Authority of Philadelphia.  He served as Ward Leader for the 47th Ward in Philadelphia and as a member of the Pennsylvania House of Representatives from 1956 to 1966 and as a member of the Pennsylvania State Senate for the 3rd district from 1967 to 1980.

He died in Philadelphia, Pennsylvania and is interred at the Rolling Green Cemetery in West Chester, Pennsylvania.

References

1914 births
1989 deaths
20th-century American politicians
African-American state legislators in Pennsylvania
Democratic Party members of the Pennsylvania House of Representatives
Democratic Party Pennsylvania state senators
Politicians from Philadelphia
20th-century African-American politicians
African-American men in politics